The RISM library abbreviations, or sigla, are used for identifying locations of musical manuscripts. The special volume RISM-Bibliothekssigel. Gesamtverzeichnis (RISM Library Sigla. Complete Index), which appeared in 1999, has been available in a regularly updated version on the RISM website since 2006 and in a searchable database online since 2011.

The complete list is very long (see pdf). Only a selection of major source locations are listed here:

 F-Pn Bibliothèque nationale de France
 GB-Lbl British Library
 GB-Ob Bodleian Library
 I-FEca :it:Curia Arcivescovile di Ferrara e Comacchio, Archivio 
 I-MOas :it:Archivio di Stato di Modena 
 I-MOe :it:Biblioteca estense universitaria di Modena
 E-Mn :es:Biblioteca Nacional de España
 E-Bbc :es:Biblioteca de Cataluña

References

External links
 Online Directory of RISM Library Sigla

RISM
Baroque music manuscript sources
Medieval music manuscript sources
Renaissance music manuscript sources
RISM